The common name white or whites may refer to several butterflies:

 Pierinae, a subfamily commonly called the whites
 Pieris, a genus of Pierinae commonly called the whites or garden whites
 Appias, another genus of Pierinae sometimes called the whites
 Pontia, a third genus of Pierinae sometimes called the whites